Miss Armenia (Armenian: Միսս Հայաստան; Miss Hayastan) is the national beauty pageant in Armenia. Its winners represent Armenia in Miss Universe, Miss World, and Miss Grand International.

History

Miss Armenia also debuted in 2017 with Miss World and in 2018 with Miss Universe. Through the Miss Armenia pageant, the winners represented her country at Miss Universe and Miss World.

It has been several years the competition "Miss Armenia" isn't being held in Armenia. "Miss Armenia" competition was first held in 1996, with certain intervals, up to 2012. Here are the winners of the "Miss Armenia" beauty competition.

After 6 years of hiatus, the Miss Armenian 2017 contest returned under the support of Armenian ministry of culture. The contest took take place in Armenian National Academic Theatre of Opera and Ballet in Yerevan.

On May 11, 2019 the original of Miss Hayastan (old, Miss Armenia) returned to hold national beauty pageant. There are two Miss Armenia contests such as Miss Hayastan (Miss Armenia) and Miss Armenian (for Miss Universe and Miss World Armenia).

In 2021, the  Miss Armenian organization purchased the license of the Miss Grand International for Armenian, which the Armenian American Kristina Ayanian was appointed to represent the country at the pageant, Ayanian was the second Armenian candidate for the said pageant following Lily Sargsyan (Miss Armenian 2017) who took part in its 2019 edition in Venezuela.

Titleholders
Color key

1996–2017

2018–present
Began 2018 the Miss Armenian separated the franchise of Miss Universe and Miss World national contest in two selections. First, the Miss Universe Armenia will crown the winner earlier than Miss World Armenia in different date before coming to International pageants. The Miss World Armenia will be crowned the new title holder in the last ending of Miss Armenia section. Armenia debuts at Miss Universe in 2018 while in 2017 Armenia started to join at the Miss World in China. Later in 2021, the organization also acquired the license of the Miss Grand International for Armenia.

Titleholders under Miss Armenia org.
The following women have represented Armenia in the international beauty pageants. The highest placement was the winner of Miss Commonwealth of CIS in 1998, won by Gohar Harutunyan, the current CEO of Miss Armenian organization.

Miss Universe Armenia

Miss World Armenia

Miss Grand Armenia 

Armenia made its debut at the Miss Grand International pageant in 2019 by Lili Sargsyan, Miss Armenia 2017 winner, under the direction of  Janna Gregory. The Miss Armenia organization later purchased the franchise in 2021..

References

External links
 missarmenia.org

 

Armenia
Armenia
Armenia
Beauty pageants in Armenia
1996 establishments in Armenia
Armenian awards